Moy Tír na nÓg is a Gaelic Athletic Association club based in the  Moy, a village in the south of County Tyrone, Northern Ireland. It fields teams at all age groups in Gaelic football and Ladies' Gaelic football, and is affiliated to Tyrone GAA, playing at present in the Senior Championship and in League Division 1. With the Senior Ladies team playing in the Intermediate, Division 2 League in Tyrone.

History
The club was founded as Moy Phelim Roe GAC in 1908, within a year of the first recorded game of Gaelic football in the village. The Moy team took part in an East Tyrone league over the next three years, and resurfaced as Moy Tír na nÓg in 1913.

Tír na nÓg remained active thereafter, apart from 1970 when it amalgamated with the now-defunct Eoghan Ruadh GAC, Benburb, to form a Clonfeacle parish team.

The club acquired new playing field and clubrooms in 1998, and opened a new training pitch in 2008, to which floodlighting was added in 2010.

Honours
 Tyrone Senior Football Championship (1)
 1920 
 Tyrone Intermediate Football Championship 
 1982, 2017
 Ulster Intermediate Club Football Championship (1) 
2017
 All-Ireland Intermediate Club Football Championship (1) 
2017
 Tyrone Junior Football Championship (2)
 1953, 1979

Notable players
The following Moy players have represented their county:
 Plunkett Donaghy
 Colin Holmes
 Philip Jordan
 Seán Cavanagh
 Colm Cavanagh
 Harry Loughran

Ladies' football
The club also fields teams in Ladies' Gaelic Football Association competitions.

 Tyrone Ladies Junior Football Championship (1) 2020

References

External links
 Moy Tír na nÓg GAC website

Gaelic games clubs in County Tyrone
Gaelic football clubs in County Tyrone
1908 establishments in Ireland